Furmanov is the name of several inhabited localities in Russia.

Urban localities
Furmanov, Ivanovo Oblast, a town in Ivanovo Oblast

Rural localities
Furmanov, Orenburg Oblast, a settlement in Furmanovsky Selsoviet of Pervomaysky District of Orenburg Oblast